Holidays in the Danger Zone: Violent Coast is a four-part travel documentary on West Africa, part of the Holidays in the Danger Zone series, produced and broadcast by BBC This World. Written and presented by Ben Anderson, It was first broadcast on BBC Four, before being repeated on BBC Two between 21–24 June 2004, and internationally during 2004 and 2005.

Episode 1: Liberia 
Episode 2: Sierra Leone
Episode 3: Ivory Coast & Benin
Episode 4: Nigeria

In the series, Anderson visits the West Africa coast, to see five former colonies that have come to symbolize all that is synonymous with the 'Violent Coast' Wars, Drugs, Dictators, Child Soldiers, Diamonds & Corruption. But with Peace on the horizon things could be about to change for the better.

See also
 Holidays in the Danger Zone
 Holidays in the Axis of Evil 
 America Was Here
 Rivers 
 Meet the Stans
 Places That Don't Exist

References

External links 
http://news.bbc.co.uk/1/hi/programmes/this_world/3808579.stm

BBC television documentaries
BBC World News shows